The Paul Bunyan State Trail is a multi-use recreational rail trail in north-central Minnesota, United States, running between the cities of Baxter/Brainerd and Bemidji.  It is named after the giant lumberjack Paul Bunyan of American folklore.

The route was part of the Burlington Northern Railroad lines abandoned in 1983. The southern extension, completed in 2012, moved the southern terminus to Crow Wing State Park. The route through Bemidji follows city streets until an off-road path can be secured. The Paul Bunyan State Trail intersects with the Heartland State Trail in Walker and in Bemidji joins the Blue Ox Trail, which continues  to the Canada–United States border.

As of 2013, the Bemidji Blue Ox Marathon runs on the portion of the trail along Lake Bemidji to Lake Bemidji State Park.

References

External links
 Paul Bunyan State Trail
 PaulBunyanTrail.com

Burlington Northern Railroad
Leech Lake
Minnesota state trails
Protected areas of Beltrami County, Minnesota
Protected areas of Cass County, Minnesota
Protected areas of Crow Wing County, Minnesota
Protected areas of Hubbard County, Minnesota
Rail trails in Minnesota
Brainerd, Minnesota